The 2012–13 season was Barnsley's seventh consecutive season in the Championship since promotion in 2006. They narrowly survived relegation thanks to a 2–2 draw with Huddersfield Town on the final day of the season to finish in 21st position.

Season review

Championship

League table

Results summary

Result round by round

Squad

Appearances and goals
Last Updated: 5 May 2013

|-
!colspan="12"|Players who are on loan:

|-
!colspan="12"|Player who left Barnsley during the season

|}

Top scorers

Disciplinary record

Suspensions served

Transfers

In

Notes
1Although official undisclosed, The Star reported the fee to be £50,000.

Loans in

Out

Notes
1Because Butterfield is under 22, Barnsley were entitled to compensation and received an Undisclosed amount.

Loans out

Contracts

Fixtures & results

Pre-season

Championship

FA Cup

Football League Cup

References

Barnsley
Barnsley F.C. seasons